Anthaxia thalassophila is a species of jewel beetles belonging to the family Buprestidae, subfamily Buprestinae.

Subspecies

Anthaxia thalassophila iberica (Cobos, 1986)
Anthaxia thalassophila pseudokervillei (Niehuis, 1990)
Anthaxia thalassophila thalassophila (Abeille de Perrin, 1900)

Description
This species is characterized by the brilliance of its colors: bright green and dark red with metallic reflections in the females, while the males in place of the red present a bright yellow color with a reddish sheen.

Ecology
Main larval host plants are in genus Pistacia, Quercus, Castanea, Fraxinus and Olea. Adults occurs from Aprils to July, especially on daisies.

Distribution
This beetle is present in France, Italy, Greece, Spain, Portugal, Switzerland, former Yugoslavia and Albania.

References 

Buprestidae
Beetles of Europe
Beetles described in 1900
Taxa named by Elzéar Abeille de Perrin